Mike or Michael  Wooldridge may refer to:

 Michael Wooldridge (born 1956), Australian doctor and politician
 Mike Wooldridge (broadcaster), British journalist; world affairs correspondent for BBC News
 Michael Wooldridge (computer scientist) (born 1966), professor at the University of Oxford